Robert Kohn may refer to:

 Robert D. Kohn (1870–1953), American architect
 Robert V. Kohn (born 1953), American mathematician